Richard Allan Petiot (born August 20, 1982) is a Canadian former professional ice hockey defenceman. He was drafted by the Los Angeles Kings in the fourth round (116th overall) of the 2001 NHL Entry Draft.

Playing career
The Los Angeles Kings drafted Petiot in 2001 from the Camrose Kodiaks of the AJHL. He then played four years of collegiate hockey with Colorado College. Petiot signed a two-year contract with the Kings after his senior year with the Tigers on August 11, 2005.

Petiot made his professional debut in the 2005–06 season, playing mostly with Kings affiliate, the Manchester Monarchs. Petiot spent the next two injury-plagued seasons with the Monarchs before signing as a free agent for the Toronto Maple Leafs on July 15, 2008.

In the 2008–09 season, the Leafs assigned Petiot to their affiliate, the Toronto Marlies, then traded him to the Tampa Bay Lightning for Olaf Kolzig, Andy Rogers, Jamie Heward and a fourth round selection on March 4, 2009.

On July 9, 2009, he was signed as a free agent by the Chicago Blackhawks.

On July 2, 2010, he was signed as a free agent with the Edmonton Oilers to a one-year contract. During the 2010–11 season, Petiot was called up from the Oklahoma City Barons to replace an injured Theo Peckham on March 1, 2011.

On July 2, 2011, Petiot was signed by former team, Tampa Bay, to a one-year, two-way contract. Petiot was limited to only 6 games during the 2011–12 season with affiliate, the Norfolk Admirals, due to injury.

With the NHL lockout affecting his status as a free agent, Petiot waited until the conclusion of the dispute before signing to a professional try-out contract with the St. John's IceCaps of the AHL on January 9, 2013.

Career statistics

References

External links

1982 births
Living people
Camrose Kodiaks players
Canadian ice hockey defencemen
Colorado College Tigers men's ice hockey players
Edmonton Oilers players
Ice hockey people from Alberta
Los Angeles Kings draft picks
Los Angeles Kings players
Manchester Monarchs (AHL) players
Norfolk Admirals players
Oklahoma City Barons players
People from Flagstaff County
Rockford IceHogs (AHL) players
St. John's IceCaps players
Tampa Bay Lightning players
Toronto Marlies players